Vern Rutsala (February 5, 1934 – April 2, 2014) was an American poet. Born in McCall, Idaho, he was educated at Reed College (B.A.) and the Iowa Writers' Workshop (M.F.A.). He taught English and creative writing at Lewis & Clark College in Portland, Oregon for more than forty years, before retiring in 2004. He also taught for short periods at the University of Minnesota, Bowling Green State University, University of Redlands, and the University of Idaho, and served in the U.S. Army, 1956–58. He died in Oregon on April 2, 2014.

Books
The Window (1964)
Small Songs: A Sequence, Stone Wall Press (1969)
The Harmful State (1971)
Laments (1975)
The Journey Begins (1976)
Paragraphs (1978)
The New Life (1978)
Walking Home from the Icehouse (1981)
The Mystery of the Lost Shoes (1985)
Backtracking (1985)
Ruined Cities (1987)
Selected Poems (1991)
Little-known Sports (1994)
The Moment's Equation (2004)
A Handbook for Writers: New and Selected Prose Poems (2004)
How We Spent Our Time (2006)
The Long Haul (2015)

Awards
National Endowment for the Arts fellowships (1974, 1979)
Northwest Poets Prize (1975)
Guggenheim Fellowship (1982)
Carolyn Kizer Poetry Prize (1988)
Masters Fellowship from the Oregon Arts Commission (1990)
Oregon Book Award (1992)
Juniper Prize (1994)
Richard Snyder Prize (2003)
finalist, National Book Award for Poetry (2005)

Notes

References
Vern Rutsala at Lewis & Clark College archives
Interview with Vern Rutsala in Reed Magazine, with audio clips

1934 births
2014 deaths
American male poets
University of Iowa alumni
University of Idaho faculty
Writers from Portland, Oregon
Reed College alumni
Lewis & Clark College faculty
People from McCall, Idaho
Poets from Idaho
20th-century American poets
Poets from Oregon
21st-century American poets
National Endowment for the Arts Fellows
20th-century American male writers
21st-century American male writers